James Robert Campbell (born January 10, 1943) is an American former professional baseball player whose ten-season career included appearing in 13 games in Major League Baseball (MLB) for the  St. Louis Cardinals, exclusively as a pinch hitter. He was born in Hartsville, South Carolina — also the hometown of Bobo Newsom, a renowned MLB pitcher of the middle 20th century — and entered pro baseball in the Philadelphia Phillies' system in 1962.

Campbell was in his ninth professional campaign when he earned a place on the Cardinals' 28-man, early-season roster in 1970. His first appearance, on April 11, came during the Redbirds' fourth game of the National League season. The next day, Campbell registered his first big-league hit, a single off eventual Baseball Hall of Famer Tom Seaver in the seventh inning of a 6–4 loss to the New York Mets. Two days later, on April 14, his ninth-inning pinch single off Howie Reed produced the tying run and Campbell's only MLB RBI in a come-from-behind 6–5 triumph against the Montreal Expos at Busch Memorial Stadium. Campbell then sat on the bench for a week before his next appearance, and was only able to collect one more hit his final ten at bats before returning to the minor leagues.  With his three singles (and no bases on balls) in his 13 MLB plate appearances, Campbell posted a career batting average, on-base percentage and slugging percentage of .231. He slugged 127 home runs in 1,207 games as a minor leaguer.

He was traded to the Boston Red Sox during the 1970 offseason for veteran infielder Ducky Schofield and played one more year at the Triple-A level before leaving the game.

References

External links

1943 births
Living people
Bakersfield Bears players
Baseball players from South Carolina
Chattanooga Lookouts players
Dothan Phillies players
Elmira Pioneers players
Eugene Emeralds players
Louisville Colonels (minor league) players
Macon Peaches players
Magic Valley Cowboys players
People from Hartsville, South Carolina
Reading Phillies players
Rochester Red Wings players
St. Louis Cardinals players
Tulsa Oilers (baseball) players